The Tuner (Nastroyshchik) is a 2004 Ukraine/Russia mix film of art house grotesque and a sting comedy. At the heart of Kira Muratova’s film is her characteristic and enduring love of predation—predation for its own sake. The film offers a complex assessment of the human subject, civilization, and the creative act. It premiered at the Venice Film Festival in September 2004.

The stars of the film include famous Russian actors such as Alla Demidova, Renata Litvinova, Nina Ruslanova, and Georgi Deliyev. Directed by Kira Muratova, author of sixteen films over forty-two years, best known in the West for her political rehabilitation during the perestroika period and the un-shelving of her so-called provincial melodramas, Brief Encounters (1967/1987) and Long Farewells (1971/1987).

Plot summary
A former nurse, Liuba, seeking marriage through newspaper personal ads, is bilked by a stranger whom she mistakes for her new date.  Liuba's elderly, well-to-do girlfriend, Anna Sergeevna is defrauded in a different fashion: having placed a newspaper ad for a piano tuner, she is entrapped by Andrei, who is not only an excellent tuner and musician, but also a reasonably good petty thief and scam artist.  Andrei and his current lover, Lina, attempting to further secure the women's trust by returning Liuba's money, which had been scammed yet again by a second potential husband cum con-artist, place their own fake personal ad in a newspaper so as to locate the suspect.  Having returned Liuba's stolen money, Andrei finally swindles both Liuba and Anna Sergeevna through an elaborate bank forgery scheme—in a word, a portrait of normal human nature à la Muratova.

Awards
 Nika Award 2004 for best actress Alla Demidova, best director Kira Muratova and best Supporting Actress Nina Ruslanova

External links

 Trailer and Screenshots

2004 films
Russian crime comedy-drama films
Ukrainian crime films
2000s Russian-language films
Films directed by Kira Muratova
Ukrainian comedy-drama films